Love Island (also known as Love Island – Heiße Flirts & wahre Liebe (English: Love Island – Hot Flirts & True Love) is a German dating reality show based on the British series Love Island. The first five seasons were presented by Jana Ina and the sixth one by Sylvie Meis. The series is narrated by Christoph Kröger. The series began airing on RTL II on September 11, 2017.

Contributors
Jana Ina is presenting the show from first season and with Christoph Kröger been the Narrated for the first two seasons and from third season is Simon Beeck. In the first season Ina was presenting the final with her husband Giovanni Zarrella. In season 4, Cathy Hummels presented some episodes because Jana Ina was tested positive for COVID-19.

Series overview

References

External links

2017 German television series debuts
German reality television series
RTL Zwei original programming
Germany
German television series based on British television series